Public Speaking is a 2010 documentary film directed and produced by Martin Scorsese, about the American author Fran Lebowitz.

The film was broadcast on HBO on November 22, 2010, prior to a limited release on February 23, 2011, by Rialto Pictures. It received positive reviews from critics. The film was nominated for Best Documentary in the Gotham Independent Film Awards 2010.

Synopsis
The film follows writer Fran Lebowitz known for her unique takes on modern life, with clips from speaking engagements.

Production
Graydon Carter initially pitched the idea to Lebowitz, with Wes Anderson attached for three years to direct the film. Due to a scheduling conflict, Martin Scorsese replaced Anderson.

Principal photography took place at The Waverly Inn in New York City.

Release
The film was broadcast on HBO on November 22, 2010. In January 2011, Rialto Pictures acquired U.S. theatrical distribution rights to the film, and set it for a February 23, 2011, limited release.

Critical reception
Public Speaking received positive reviews from film critics. It holds a 92% approval rating on review aggregator website Rotten Tomatoes, based on 12 reviews, with a weighted average of 7.90/10. On Metacritic, the film holds a rating of 75 out of 100, based on 9 critics, indicating "generally favorable reviews".

Accolades

Accolades

References

External links
 

2010 films
2010 documentary films
American documentary films
Films directed by Martin Scorsese
Documentary films about women writers
Films produced by Martin Scorsese
Films produced by Graydon Carter
HBO documentary films
2010s English-language films
2010s American films
English-language documentary films